Phú Long may refer to several places in Vietnam, including:

Phú Long, Bình Thuận, a township of Hàm Thuận Bắc District
Phú Long, Bến Tre, a commune of Bình Đại District
Phú Long, Đồng Tháp, a commune of Châu Thành District, Đồng Tháp
Phú Long, Ninh Bình, a commune of Nho Quan District
Phú Long, An Giang, a commune of Phú Tân District, An Giang